The 19325/19326 Indore - Amritsar Express is an express trains of the Indian Railways which runs between Indore Junction in Madhya Pradesh and Amritsar Junction in Punjab.

Coach Composition

The train consists of 22 coaches :

 1 AC II Tier
 4 AC III Tier
 11 Sleeper Class
 4 General Unreserved
 2 End On Generator

References

Transport in Indore
Rail transport in Madhya Pradesh
Express trains in India
Transport in Amritsar
Railway services introduced in 2008
Rail transport in Punjab, India